Bryomima is a genus of moths of the family Noctuidae.

Species
 Bryomima carducha Staudinger, 1900
 Bryomima hakkariensis de Freina & Hacker, 1985

References
 Bryomima at Markku Savela's Lepidoptera and Some Other Life Forms
 Natural History Museum Lepidoptera genus database

Cuculliinae